Maria Zemankova (born 6 January 1951 ) is a Computer Scientist who is known for the theory and implementation of the first Fuzzy Relational Database System. This research has become important for the handling of approximate queries in databases. She retired from the Intelligent Information Systems Division at the National Science Foundation July 2020. She is the first (1992) recipient of the SIGMOD Contributions Award for her work in the conception of initiatives in research on scientific databases and digital libraries. She received her Ph.D. in Computer Science in 1983 from Florida State University for her work on Fuzzy Relational Database Systems.

References

Living people
1951 births
Florida State University alumni
American women computer scientists
American computer scientists
21st-century American women